Flame Tree Publishing is an independent publisher of books, calendars and other stationery items, based in Fulham, London, United Kingdom with an editorial office in New York. It focuses on art, music, lifestyle and fiction categories. Flame Tree creates content in the form of paper printed encyclopedias, guides and practical books and publishes them in different book, gift, stationery and digital markets worldwide. It has a number of license arrangements with museums, galleries and other licensors, including Tate, V&A and The Royal Academy of Arts. The publisher started releasing e-books and launched a new fantasy, crime and science fiction classics imprint called Flame Tree 451. In 2015 Flame Tree launched a range of deluxe Gothic Fantasy titles combining new stories from open submissions and curated classic writing. In 2018 a new trade imprint fiction imprint called Flame Tree Press began to publish new novels in the horror and suspense, sf and fantasy and crime and mystery genres.

Origins 

Flame Tree was established in 1992 as The Flame Tree Publishing Company, a part-time illustrated art book and gift packaging operation by founder Nick Wells. In 1995 Wells left HarperCollins Publishers to turn Flame Tree into a full-time business, operating from an office in Chiswick.  The company name was changed to The Foundry Creative Media Company Ltd but Flame Tree Publishing was retained as the publishing imprint and brand. Managing Director Frances Bodiam joined in 1996. Wells and Bodiam continue to run the business. In 2012 The company name changed to Flame Tree Publishing Ltd and John Holloran and Ross Clayton of Marston Book Services Ltd invested to provide distribution and accounting services.

Activity 
In the first few years Flame Tree's main activity was to create a range of packaged books for a series of corporate publishers, including HarperCollins (25 of the original colour reference Collins Gems and two illustrated encyclopedias), Dorling Kindersley (including 16 K.I.S.S. Guides, such as Astrology) and 24 of the then Letts Education's Success Guides to KS3, and GCSE

During this period Flame Tree started to create and sell calendars and greeting cards to retail markets and has exhibited at the Spring Fair and Autumn International Gift Shows at the NEC since 1997.

In 1998, Flame Tree moved into new premises on the borders of Hammersmith and Fulham, close to The River Café (London) and, at that time, a few minutes walk from several other publishers, Virgin Books, HarperCollins and Constable & Robinson. Flame Tree started publishing into the UK and international markets, focusing on art, music, cookery and general reference. Among its first books were Guitar Facts, An Illustrated Guide and Simple Cookery: Wok and Stir Fry both of which demonstrate Flame Tree's method of creating practical content for everyday use. Step-by-step photos continue to be a feature of many of their publications. In 2015 Flame Tree moved to its current premises near the Kings Road in Fulham, by Putney Bridge tube station, coinciding with a greater concentration on art, music and fiction.

Flame Tree exhibits at a number annual trade shows including the London Book Fair, The Spring Fair International Gift Show, Frankfurt Book Fair, BookExpo America. and The Beijing International Bookfair.

Flame Tree's brand The Art of Fine Gifts includes illustrated art books, art calendars and deluxe notebooks featuring licensed and created art by a wide range of modern artists and illustrators such as Josephine Wall, Kerim Beyit, Ann Stokes and Lesley Anne Ivory

In 2019 Flame Tree and the Chinese media giant Phoenix Publishing and Media Group held a signing ceremony at the Beijing International Bookfair for a cooperation venture in the Chinese and English language markets.

Gothic, dark fantasy and science fiction 
2015 saw the publication of the first titles in a new range of deluxe edition short story collections which combined new writing from submission calls online, and curated classic writing. Examples include Chilling Ghosts Short Stories, Time Travel Short Stories and Agents & Spies Short Stories.

2018 sees the launch of Flame Tree Press a new trade imprint for novels in genre fiction, mainly horror, sf, dark fantasy and crime. First writers include Bram Stoker Award winner John Everson, Jonathan Janz and Brian Trent, with new writers and novels in translation from China. Ramsey Campbell endorsed the launch of the new list which included the publication of his own Thirteen Days by Sunset Beach.

In 2020 Flame Tree announced a partnership with Compelling Science Fiction magazine, a US publisher of plausible science fiction.

Trade bodies 
Flame Tree is a member of the Independent Publishers Guild (IPG) and The Greeting Card Association (GCE).

Notable books 
 Guitar Chords. Edited by Jake Jackson.
 World Art: The Definitive Illustrated Guide. Foreword by Mike O'Mahony.
 Animation Art Author Jerry Beck. Forewords by Jeffrey Katzenberg and Bill Plympton.
 Dragon Art. Author Graeme Aymer. Foreword by John Howe.
 Art Deco: The Golden Age of Graphic Art and Design. Author: Michael Robinson.
 William Morris: Artist, Craftsman, Pioneer . Author: N.M. Wells and R. Ormiston.
 British History, An Illustrated Guide. Editor: Professor Eric J. Evans.
 Kings, Queens, Chiefs & Rulers. Editor: Professor David Loades.
 For the Love of Cupcakes. Author: Ann Nicol.
 The Definitive Encyclopedia of Rock. Foreword by Scotty Moore.
 Guitar Heroes. Foreword by Brian May.
 Led Zeppelin Revealed. Author: Jason Draper. Foreword by Paul du Noyer.
 Classical Music Encyclopedia.. Edited by Stanley Sadie, Foreword by Vladimir Ashkenazy.
 The Illustrated Encyclopedia of Music.. Foreword by Sir George Martin.
 The Illustrated Encyclopedia of Opera.. Edited by Stanley Sadie, Foreword by Philip Langridge.
 The Definitive Guitar Handbook.. Foreword by Paco Peña.
 The Sorrows by Jonathan Janz 
The Influence by Ramsey Campbell

Notable calendar ranges 
 Erté (Romain de Tirtoff)
 Alphonse Mucha
 Louis Comfort Tiffany
 Gustav Klimt
 Tate calendars and diaries.
 V&A calendars and diaries.
 The British Museum calendars and diaries.
Angela Harding calendars and diaries

Notable eBooks 
 Interpreting Dreams. Author: Adam Fronteras. General Editor: Rashid Ahmad.
 The Songwriters Rhyming Dictionary. Author: Jake Jackson.
 World War II. Authors: Jon and Diane Sutherland. Introduction: Paul Cornish.
Animation Art. Author and Editor Jerry Beck.

References

External links 
 flametreepublishing.com
 flametreepress.com

British speculative fiction publishers
Publishing companies established in 1992
Book publishing companies based in London
Visual arts publishing companies
Science fiction publishers
Ebook suppliers